Saha is a lunar impact crater on the Moon's far side, behind the eastern limb as seen from the Earth. It lies less than one crater diameter due east of the similar-sized Wyld, and to the north-northwest of the large walled plain Pasteur.

This crater has been worn and damaged by subsequent impacts, including the satellite crater Saha W which lies across the northwest rim and inner wall. The inner sides still display some terrace-like  shelf structures, but these have become worn and have lost definition. There is a small, bowl-shaped crater Saha M in the southwestern part of the interior floor. To the north of this feature is an arcing ridge feature. The floor is otherwise pitted by various tiny craterlets.

Satellite craters
By convention these features are identified on lunar maps by placing the letter on the side of the crater midpoint that is closest to Saha.

References

 
 
 
 
 
 
 
 
 
 
 
 

Impact craters on the Moon